The 1979 South Pacific Classic was an Association of Tennis Professionals men's tournament held on outdoor grass courts at the Milton Courts in Brisbane, Queensland, Australia that was part of the  1979 Grand Prix tennis circuit. It was the sixth edition of the tournament and was held from 8 October until 14 October 1979. Unseeded Phil Dent won the singles title.

Finals

Singles
 Phil Dent defeated  Ross Case 7–6, 6–2, 6–3
 It was Dent's 1st singles title of the year and the 2nd of his career.

Doubles
 Geoff Masters /  Ross Case defeated  John James /  Chris Kachel 7–6, 6–2

References

External links
 ITF tournament edition details

South Pacific Championships
South Pacific Championships, 1979
South Pacific Championships
South Pacific Championships
Sports competitions in Brisbane
Tennis in Queensland